Bandar Bukit Tinggi is an integrated and modern township in Klang, Selangor, Malaysia. The RM5 billion (over US$1.6 billion) self-sufficient mature township has a wide range of facilities and amenities.

Bukit Tinggi consists of 3 major development areas, namely Bukit Tinggi 1 (BT1), Bukit Tinggi 2 (BT2) and Bukit Tinggi 3 (also known as Klang Parklands). Adjacent to Bukit Tinggi are some other modern townships such as Botanic Klang, Glenmarie Cove, Bandar Puteri Klang, Kota Bayuemas and Bandar Bestari (Canary Garden).

Retail and food 
Bukit Tinggi in Klang has hundreds of food and dining outlets in the township such as Mamak stalls, kopi tiams, bak kut teh, steamboat, seafood, Kajang satay, Western, Asian, nasi kandar, Chinese, fast food and vegetarian restaurants.

This integrated township has 2 hypermarkets, Tesco and Giant Hypermarket and a modern business hotel with 300 rooms, the Première Hotel. There are various amenities in Bukit Tinggi that serve more than 90,000 residents, including banks, offices, petrol stations, recreational parks, health clinics, gyms and schools. This makes Bukit Tinggi the most successful and fastest growing township in the royal town of Klang.

Developed by property developer and construction player WCT Holdings Berhad since 1997, Bukit Tinggi is also the home to the AEON Bukit Tinggi Shopping Centre, the largest AEON (Jusco) store in Southeast Asia. The shopping mall has a gross lettable area of approximately one million square feet and over 5000 car park bays.

Next to the AEON Bukit Tinggi is an integrated development comprising 20-block of retail offices and 2-block of 9-storey corporate office suites named The Landmark (with a gross development value of RM180 million). Next to The Landmark is the Impiria Residences, comprising 2 high-rise blocks of service apartments and retail shops. A boutique hotel called The Canvas Hotel with 98 rooms is scheduled to open in 3Q 2018. The Landmark, Impiria Residences and The Canvas Hotel are all directly linked to the AEON Bukit Tinggi Shopping Centre via skybridges.

Manipal Hospitals Klang (MHK), a US$100 million private medical centre with 220 beds, is located in this township. Operational since 18 July 2016, Manipal Hospitals Klang provides a modern tertiary levels of healthcare service with super specialities including cardiothoracic, paediatric and neuro surgeries as well as a 24-hour trauma centre with a team of over 300 nursing staff and 60 resident and visiting specialists.

Administration 
Bandar Bukit Tinggi is under the jurisdiction of the Klang Municipal Council (MPK), and is represented in the Parliament by the Member of Parliament for Kota Raja (P111 parliamentary seat), Mr. Mohamad Sabu who is also the Minister of Defence. At the Selangor state government level, the township is represented by the Sentosa state (N48 state seat) assemblyman, Mr. Gunarajah George.

The residents of the township are represented by the Residents' Association of Bukit Tinggi (PPBT). The Bukit Tinggi police station provides a good security presence in the township.

Location and connectivity 
The integrated township development of Bandar Bukit Tinggi in Klang is located strategically just 50 km west of Kuala Lumpur and 30 km from Petaling Jaya. It is accessible via major highways of which the nearest is the KESAS highway. The upcoming West Coast Expressway (WCE) will also be built next to the township.

In terms of Internet connectivity, the township is fully connected to the national high-speed broadband (HSBB) grid on fibre optic lines. Bukit Tinggi is serviced by public bus service providers with direct route to the Klang town centre, Kuala Lumpur, Banting and the Kuala Lumpur International Airport.

By August 2020, Bukit Tinggi will also be connected to the RM 9 billion LRT 3 rail line, with 2 elevated LRT stations (Tesco Bukit Tinggi station and AEON Bukit Tinggi station) located in the mature township, serving as a major component to the Klang Valley Public Transport System.

References

External links
 Aerobus express service between Bukit Tinggi and KLIA and KLIA2
 High-end retail centre for Bukit Tinggi, The Star
 Klang-Shah Alam corridor a future hub, The Star
 Bukit Tinggi police station
 WCT Holdings Berhand, Developer of Bukit Tinggi
 Upside for Klang, The New Straits Times
 LRT3 route agreed at over 35km between PJ and Klang

Townships in Selangor
Klang (city)